Elections for the 13th Knesset were held in Israel on 23 June 1992. The election resulted in the formation of a Labor government, led by Yitzhak Rabin, helped by the failure of several small right wing parties to pass the electoral threshold. Voter turnout was 77.4%.

Parliament factions

The table below lists the parliamentary factions represented in the 12th Knesset.

Results

Aftermath

Labour's Yitzhak Rabin formed the twenty-fifth government on 13 July 1992, including Meretz and Shas in his coalition, which had 17 ministers. Hadash and the Arab Democratic Party also supported the government despite not being coalition members. Shas left the coalition in September 1993, and Yiud joined in January 1995.

Rabin's government advanced the peace process to unprecedented levels; the Oslo Accords were signed with Yasser Arafat's PLO in 1993 and the Israel–Jordan peace treaty in 1994. The government's willingness to make peace with Syria and concede the Golan Heights led to Avigdor Kahalani and Emanuel Zisman leaving the party to form the Third Way.

After Rabin's assassination on 4 November 1995, Shimon Peres took over as Prime Minister and formed a new government on 22 November 1995. His coalition was the same as before; Labor, Meretz and Yiud. Peres called early elections in 1996 in order to seek a mandate to continue the peace process, in which he lost.

The Knesset term saw several defections; two MKs left the Labor Party to establish the Third Way, whilst Nava Arad also left the party. Two MKs left Likud to establish Gesher, whilst Efraim Gur also left the party. Three MKs left Tzomet to establish Yiud; one MK then left Yiud to establish Atid. Yosef Azran left Shas. One MK left Moldet to establish Yamin Yisrael, whilst Yosef Ba-Gad also left the party. United Torah Judaism split into Agudat Yisrael (two seats) and Degel HaTorah (two seats).

See also
1992 Israeli Labor Party leadership election
1992 Israeli Labor Party primary
1992 Likud leadership election

Notes

References

External links
 Historical overview of the Thirteenth Knesset Knesset website
 Election results Knesset website

Israeli legislative
Legislative election
Legislative elections in Israel
June 1992 events in Asia
Israel